The team relay competition at the 2021 FIL European Luge Championships was held on 10 January 2021.

Results
The event was started at 13:56.

References

Team relay